Deborah Harkness (born 1965) is an American scholar and novelist, best known as an historian and as the author of the All Souls Trilogy, which consists of The New York Times best-selling novel A Discovery of Witches and its sequels Shadow of Night and The Book of Life. Her latest book is Time's Convert, both an origin story of the trilogy's Marcus Whitmore character, set in the American War of Independence and the French Revolution, and a sequel to the All Souls Trilogy.

Early life
Born in 1965, Harkness grew up near Philadelphia, Pennsylvania, the daughter of an American-born father and a British-born mother.  She is a graduate of Mount Holyoke College (B.A., 1986), Northwestern University (M.A., 1990), and the University of California, Davis (Ph.D., 1994). Harkness also studied abroad at Oxford University. She is a well-regarded historian of science and medicine, as well as having studied alchemy, magic and the occult.

Career
Harkness is a professor of history and teaches European history and the history of science at the University of Southern California. She has published two works of historical non-fiction, John Dee's Conversations with Angels: Cabala, Alchemy and the End of Nature (1999) and The Jewel House: Elizabethan London and the Scientific Revolution (2007).

In 2011, Harkness published her first work of fiction, A Discovery of Witches. The first novel in the All Souls trilogy, A Discovery of Witches is a historical fiction novel that tells the story of a modern-day witch who inadvertently calls up an ancient enchanted manuscript at Oxford University's Bodleian Library thereby attracting the unwelcome notice of a host of magical creatures who live among humans, including other witches, daemons, and a 1,500-year-old French vampire. The novel debuted at number two on The New York Times Best Seller hardcover fiction list, and has been sold in at least 34 countries. The book was called "a sophisticated fairy tale for adults" by the San Antonio Express-News. The second novel in the series, Shadow of Night, was published a year later, becoming a number one success on The New York Times Best Seller list. The third novel in the series is called The Book of Life. The book was published on July 15, 2014, in hardback, e-book, and audiobook in the US, UK, Canada, and Ireland.

On January 9, 2014, the United States front cover and a two-page excerpt were released to the public on USA Today. On May 12, 2014, chapter 1 was released on Harkness' website. Harkness is also the author of the award-winning wine blog, Good Wine Under $20.

Harkness released a companion book in May 2018 entitled The World of All Souls: The Complete Guide to A Discovery of Witches, Shadow of Night, and The Book of Life (All Souls Trilogy), followed in September 2018 by an All Souls series trilogy prequel/sequel entitled Time's Convert.  The book features Marcus Whitmore, Matthew Clairmont's vampire son.

Harkness is an executive producer of BadWolf's eight episode television series based on Harkness' novel, A Discovery of Witches. The series premiered in the UK on Sky One on September 14, 2018, and is now streaming on NOW TV. The international distribution of the series is handled by Sky Vision.
It was revealed by Sky One on All Souls Day (November 2) 2018 that the TV series would be extended by seasons 2 and 3, corresponding to the A Discovery of Witches sequels Shadow of Night and The Book of Life. Season 2 (10 episodes) was released in early 2021, and season 3 ( 7 episodes) in early 2022.

Personal life
Harkness currently lives in Southern California where she is a professor of history.

Bibliography

Novels

All Souls
 
 
 
 *
*Many of the events in Times Convert take place in the present-day, however a portion of them take place prior to the events of A Discovery of Witches. In other words, Times Convert acts as a sequel to the trilogy while also containing a prequel component.

Companions
The All Souls Real-Time Reading Companion (2015)
The World of All Souls: A Complete Guide to A Discovery of Witches, Shadow of Night, and the Book of Life (2018)

Books 

 
  (see also The Jewel House)

Journal articles

Awards

 Honorary Degree, Mount Holyoke College (2014)

Harkness' faculty profile on the University of Southern California's website also lists the following honors and awards:

 Highly Commended, Longman-History Today Awards Book Prize, Spring 2009
 Recipient of National or International Prize in Discipline, Pfizer Award for Best Book in the History of Science, History of Science Society, Fall 2008
 Recipient of National or International Prize in Discipline, John Best Snow Prize for Best Book in British Studies, North American Conference on British Studies, Fall 2008
 Prize for Best Book, Pacific Coast Conference on British Studies, Spring 2008
 Huntington Library Research Fellowship Recipient, National Endowment for the Humanities Fellow, 2006–2007
 Guggenheim Fellowship Recipient, John S. Guggenheim Foundation Fellowship, 2004–2005
 Residency at the National Humanities Center, National Humanities Center, John E. Sawyer Fellow, 2004–2005
 NIH/NSF Career Development Award, National Science Foundation Senior Scholar's Award, 2001–2002
 Recipient of National or International Prize in Discipline, Derek Price Award for Best Article, History of Science Society, 1998
 American Council of Learned Societies Fellowship Recipient, ACLS Fellowship, 1997–1998
 Huntington Library Research Fellowship Recipient, NEH Fellowship, Huntington Library, 1997–1998
 Recipient of National or International Prize in Discipline, Nelson Prize for Best Article, Renaissance Society of America, 1997
 Jacob K. Javits Fellowship, U.S. Department of Education, 1989–1993
 Fulbright Award, Fulbright Fellowship to the United Kingdom, 1991–1992

Notes

External links 
 
 Deborah Harkness official Facebook page

1965 births
21st-century American novelists
American medical historians
American women novelists
American historians of science
Living people
American women historians
Women science writers
21st-century American women writers
University of California, Davis alumni
21st-century American non-fiction writers
Mount Holyoke College alumni
Inkpot Award winners